Robert F. Ensko I (October 17, 1855 – May 13, 1934) also known as Robert Ensko, Sr. was a Manhattan silver expert and author of Makers of Early American Silver in 1915. The book in its multiple editions has become the standard reference work for antique American silver.

Birth and siblings
Robert was the son of William Arthur Ensko I (c1830-1858) and Charlotte Coughlin (c1830-1895) who emigrated from Ennis, County Clare, Ireland. Charlotte remarried after William's death. Her new husband was Albert Moore (1822-?) and her children moved into his house. Robert's siblings include: William Arthur Ensko II (1850–1889) who married Eloise Lindauer I (1852–1944); Charlotte Ensko (1854-1918) aka Lottie Ensko; and Richard Ensko (1857-1902) who married and had children, but little is known of him. The family was living in Manhattan between 1870 and 1880.

Marriage
Robert married Mary Elizabeth Bleakley (1858–1939) on December 4, 1878 in Manhattan, and had the following children: Robert Ensko II (1880–1971) who worked as a lace dealer and married Leah Spurrell (1891–1972); Charlotte Ensko (1882–?) who married Milton Ernest Horn; Lamont Northrope Ensko (1890–1987) who worked in the family silver business and married Bernice (1890–?) but had no children; Stephen Guernsey Cook Ensko (1896–1969) who married Dorothea Winterloff (1892–1977) and worked in the family silver business; Elathene Amanda Ensko (1898–1989) who married George Robert Christie (1894–1993); and William Edward Ensko (1888–1918) who married Alma Dorothy (1891–1984) and died in a car accident in France during World War I as a sergeant in the US Army.

Mother remarries
In 1870-1880 Robert was living in the home of Albert Moore, a cable car conductor, who was his now widowed stepfather. In 1880 Robert was working as a shoe manufacturer, living with his wife, Mary, and their newborn son, Robert Ensko II.

Silver
Robert started a family business of making modern reproductions of antique silver in New York and he authored a book: Makers of Early American Silver in 1915. Joslin Hall writes: 
In this work Ensko was attempting to list known and unknown makers of American silver, their locality and working dates. He lists marks where they are known, and ... concedes the honor of being the first book of marks of American silversmiths to [the] French because Ensko does not actually picture reproductions of the marks themselves, but simply lists them. He also includes several lists of unknown marks, including a group of pieces from the Clearwater Collection, and asks the readers to send him any information they might have. An exceedingly interesting seminal study of American silversmiths.

His son Stephen Guernsey Cook Ensko (1896–1969) would eventually publish three more editions of the book, and his granddaughter Dorothea Charlotte Ensko (1920- ) would publish an additional one.  Robert appears in the 1920 and 1930 Manhattan Directory dealing in "antiques" at 682 Lexington Avenue, and living at 799 Park Avenue.

Death
He died on May 14, 1934 and his funeral notice appeared in the New York Times on May 15, 1934. He was buried in Green-Wood Cemetery in Brooklyn on May 16, 1934. The probating of his will was reported on May 24, 1934.

Archive
Some of Robert's correspondences with Heinrich Schwarz are archived at the Rhode Island School of Design, Museum of Art, Providence, Rhode Island. Other letters are archived with the Bernard M. Bloomfield Papers, 1743-1963 at Winterthur in Delaware. One letter is dated January 7, 1917 and is addressed to Maurice Brix and concerns "the earliest date for the firm of H.I. Pepper and Sons". Other letters between Maurice Brix and Hollis French dated: February 18, 1927; March 4, 1927; and April 4, 1927 inquire about Robert Ensko's publications. The Metropolitan Museum of Art has one piece of silver that was owned by Robert Ensko, Inc.: A two-handled bowl dated between 1700–1710, made by Cornelius Kierstede (1674–c1757). It is MMA 38.63.

Ensko books
1915 Makers of Early American Silver Robert Ensko (1852–1934)
1927 American Silversmiths and Their Marks; Stephen Ensko (1896–1969)
1937 American Silversmiths and Their Marks; Stephen Ensko (1896–1969)
1948 American Silversmiths and Their Marks; Stephen Ensko (1896–1969)
1992 American Silversmiths and Their Marks; Dorothea Charlotte Ensko (1920- ) and Vernon Charles Wyle (1912–1986)

References

External links
Metropolitan Museum: Ensko Silver

American businesspeople
Burials at Green-Wood Cemetery
1855 births
1934 deaths